The 1970 Bucknell Bison football team was an American football team that represented Bucknell University as an independent during the 1970 NCAA College Division football season.

In their second year under head coach Fred Prender, the Bison compiled a 4–6 record. Gene Depew and Don Giacomelli were the team captains. 

Following the decision by the Middle Atlantic Conference to end football competition in its University Division, the Bison competed as a football independent in 1970, though five of the former league rivals (Bucknell, Delaware, Gettysburg, Lafayette and Lehigh) continued to play an informal round-robin called the "Middle Five". 

Bucknell also played Temple, another matchup that had been a divisional game in 1969. The two MAC teams had met annually since 1927, competing for a rivalry trophy known as "The Old Shoe". This year saw their last meeting for nearly 50 years.

Bucknell played its home games at Memorial Stadium on the university campus in Lewisburg, Pennsylvania.

Schedule

References

Bucknell
Bucknell Bison football seasons
Bucknell Bison football